Line 9 of Suzhou Rail Transit, also known as the East-West Express Line is a planned east–west rapid transit line in Suzhou. No official public construction date is available, however construction is expected to start before 2035. It will serve Suzhou New District, Gusu District, Suzhou Industrial Park, Kunshan, and Taicang.

Line 9 is planned as the East-West Express Line. Due to the lack of capacity on Line 1, Line 9 is to make up for rapid transit linking Suzhou New District, Gusu District, and Suzhou Industrial Park to Kunshan and Taicang.

References

Suzhou Rail Transit lines